Yamaleela Aa Taruvatha was an Indian Telugu-language fantasy drama television show that aired on ETV. It is a sequel of 1994 film Yamaleela. In this serial, Ali and Manju Bhargavi reprised their roles as Suraj and Suraj's mother respectively. Although a sequel has been made, the show is based on the events that happened after the Yamaleela (1996). The plot revolves around Suraj's daughter Chinni, who is adopted by a village woman when her parents are killed by a deadly accident and her grandmother tries to find her at any cost.

Plot 
After the events of the film, Suraj and his wife Nikhita are going somewhere while they pass through a forest. But, as their fate turned out, they met a deadly accident. Their baby daughter is also born at that critical time. Fortunately, a village woman adopts the baby. The girl is named Chinni. Meanwhile, her grandmother Saradamba tries a lot of ways to find her granddaughter. While the whole thing is happening, the spirit of Suraj always keeps an eye on his daughter. Is Saradamba able to find her granddaughter forms the whole plot.

Cast

Production 
Although having a sequel of Yamaleela, the director S. V. Krishna Reddy decided to have a soap opera for the follow-up story based on the events happened after Yamaleela. Ali and Manju Bhargavi reprised their roles as Suraj and his mother, Sharadamba respectively. Nikhita was roped in to play the role of Suraj's wife. Suman replaced veteran actor Kaikala Satyanarayana as Yama. YouTuber Sonia Singh was roped in to play the lead role. The show premiered on 21 September 2020.

Broadcast 
The show airs on ETV Telugu Monday to Friday at 8:30 p.m. The episode can also be seen at ETV's digital platform ETV Win and in ETV Telugu YouTube channel. The soap opera started airing 21 September 2020. The soap concluded on 2 April 2022.

See also 
Yamaleela
Yamaleela 2
S. V. Krishna Reddy
ETV Telugu

References 

ETV Telugu original programming
Indian television soap operas
Telugu-language television shows
2020 Indian television series debuts
2022 Indian television series endings